Adocus beatus is an extinct species of aquatic turtles belonging to the family Adocidae.

Description
Adocus beatus had flattened and smoothly contoured shells with horny sculptured plates. The shells could reach a length of about 80 cm.

Distribution
These turtles have been found in Cretaceous to Paleogene of United States.

References

The Paleobiology Database
Paleocene Mammals
Recently Collected Specimen of Adocus
E.V. Syromyatnikova and I.G. Danilov NEW MATERIAL AND A REVISION OF TURTLES OF THE GENUS ADOCUS (ADOCIDAE) FROM THE LATE CRETACEOUS OF MIDDLE ASIA AND KAZAKHSTAN
Yale Digital Content

Trionychia
Extinct turtles
Cryptodira